John B. Quimby was a member of the Wisconsin State Senate.

Biography
An Irish emigrant, Quimby was born on May 15, 1823. Born John Bartlett, he was later adopted by John Quimby and took his family name. He settled in Sauk City, Wisconsin in 1851.

In 1856, Quimby married Sarah E. Leland. They would have eight children. Quimby was a convert to Presbyterianism from Methodism. He died on February 2, 1904.

Career
Quimby represented the 14th District of the Senate during the 1872, 1873, 1874 and 1875 sessions. Additionally, he was District Attorney, Clerk and County Judge of Sauk County, Wisconsin. He was a Republican.

References

Irish emigrants to the United States (before 1923)
People from Sauk City, Wisconsin
Republican Party Wisconsin state senators
District attorneys in Wisconsin
Wisconsin state court judges
County clerks in Wisconsin
American Presbyterians
Converts to Presbyterianism
Methodists from Wisconsin
19th-century Methodists
American adoptees
1823 births
1904 deaths
19th-century American judges